Keep Running, previously known as Running Man China, or Hurry Up, Brother before 2017, is a Chinese variety show broadcast on ZRTG: Zhejiang Television. It is a spin-off from the popular original South Korean variety show Running Man by SBS. It was first aired on 10 October 2014. The show is classified as a game-variety show, where the MCs and guests complete missions at a landmark to win a race.

Program name
When the show was first announced, it was known as "" or "Running Man" in Chinese. Programs on the Zhejiang TV channel required names with five Chinese characters (words), hence the program was then renamed to "" or "Hurry Up, Brother". But, before the official name changed, ZRTG had registered "" as a trademark with the SAIC.

Episode style
 or "Name-tag Elimination" is one of the main games of each episode and is usually the longest game. There are also many games played by the MCs and guests that often contribute to their result for the final mission.

The team that wins the final mission will receive a prize, usually related to the theme of the episode. However, even if a team wins most of the games, victory is not guaranteed (for example in Season 1 Episode 2, Deng Chao did not win many games but the other teams who had won did not make the right choices of switching the waters, therefore causing their team to win).

Personnel

Cast
The original members of Running Man are Deng Chao, Angelababy, Li Chen, Chen He, Zheng Kai, Wong Cho-lam, and Wang Baoqiang.

After season 1, Wang Baoqiang recorded his last episode  and left the program to focus on his career but returned on season 3, episode 10 as a guest.

In season 2, Bao Bei'er replaced Wang Baoqiang but left at the end of the season as he was cast in Stephen Chow's Journey to the West II.

Singer Lu Han then replaced Bao Bei'er from season 3 to season 6.

Dilraba Dilmurat replaced Angelababy in season 5 due to Angelababy's pregnancy. Due to scheduling conflicts, Dilraba left in season 6.

For season 7, Deng Chao, Chen He and Lu Han left due to scheduling conflicts, while Wong Cho-Lam left to focus on his family. Lucas from South Korean boy group NCT and its Chinese unit WayV, Song Yuqi from South Korean girl group (G)I-dle and actors Zhu Yawen and Wang Yanlin replaced them in the new season.

For season 8, Zhu Yawen and Wang Yanlin left due to scheduling conflicts. Singer Cai Xukun, actor/comedian Guo Qilin, and actor Sha Yi joined as new members and replaced them. Lucas and Song Yuqi, who are both based in South Korea, were absent for the whole season due to COVID-19 pandemic and travel restrictions.

For the Yellow River special season, Lucas and Yuqi were again absent. Cai Xukun only participated in episodes 1-2 due to scheduling conflicts, while Guo Qilin only participated in episodes 3-4 due to scheduling conflicts. Zheng Kai was absent from episodes 1-2 due to the birth of his daughter.

For Season 9, Guo Qilin left the cast due to scheduling conflicts while Lucas and Yuqi rejoined the cast. Yuqi was absent from the first few episodes due to quarantine restrictions.

In Season 10, it was announced due to scheduling conflicts, Lucas would not be involved in filming, while Yuqi left to focus on her career. Actor Bai Lu, Actor and Singer Zhou Shen joined the cast, along with Cai Xukun after a temporary hiatus in the 2nd Yellow River season.

List of episodes
If more than one set of teams are used other than the Race Mission teams, they are divided and distinguished to the corresponding mission under Teams. Team members are listed in alphabetical order from Team Leader to Members, to Guests. As some episodes consisted of road missions and were not confined to a single landmark nor was a landmark officially recognized on-air, the landmark shown for those episodes is the final mission venue.

List of episodes

Series overview

Movie
Running Man is a 2015 Chinese reality comedy film directed by Hu Jia and Cen Junyi. Deng Chao was unable to participate in the movie filming due to scheduling conflicts. The movie was released to theaters on 30 January 2015.

List of guests
The following is a compilation of guests and the number of time they have been on the show. They are listed in order of appearance.

Ratings

First season

|-
|1/01
| 10 October 2014
|1.132
|3.92
|3
|-
|1/02
| 17 October 2014
|1.808
|5.95
|1
|-
|1/03
| 24 October 2014
|2.180
|7.25
|1
|-
|1/04
| 31 October 2014
|2.140
|6.68
|1
|-
|1/05
| 7 November 2014
|2.489
|8.04
|1
|-
|1/06
| 14 November 2014
|2.210
|7.09
|1
|-
|1/07
| 21 November 2014
|2.455
|7.81
|1
|-
|1/08
| 28 November 2014
|2.408
|7.73
|1
|-
|1/09
| 5 December 2014
|2.486
|8.01
|1
|-
|1/10
| 12 December 2014
|2.775
|9.05
|1
|-
|1/11
| 19 December 2014
|2.889
|9.59
|1
|-
|1/12
| 26 December 2014
|3.162
|10.07
|1
|-
|1/13
| 2 January 2015
|3.180
|9.52
|1
|-
|1/14
| 9 January 2015
|4.116
|12.43
|1
|-
|1/15
| 16 January 2015
|3.993
|12.22
|1
|-
|1/SP
| 23 January 2015
|2.373
|7.14
|2

Second season

|-
|2/01
| 17 April 2015
|4.794
|15.10
|1
|-
|2/02
| 24 April 2015
|4.886
|16.24
|1
|-
|2/03
| 1 May 2015
|4.484
|15.21
|1
|-
|2/04
| 8 May 2015
|4.549
|14.81
|1
|-
|2/05
| 15 May 2015
|4.303
|13.95
|1
|-
|2/06
| 22 May 2015
|4.830
|15.75
|1
|-
|2/07
| 29 May 2015
|4.462
|14.86
|1
|-
|2/08
| 5 June 2015
|4.828
|15.62
|1
|-
|2/09
| 12 June 2015
|5.002
|16.43
|1
|-
|2/10
| 19 June 2015
|5.016
|16.20
|1
|-
|2/11
| 26 June 2015
|4.999
|16.04
|1
|-
|2/12
| 3 July 2015
|4.915
|16.35
|1

Third season

|-
|3/01
| 30 October 2015
|3.929
|13.95
|1
|-
|3/02
| 6 November 2015
|3.970
|13.17
|1
|-
|3/03
| 13 November 2015
|4.461
|14.40
|1
|-
|3/04
| 20 November 2015
|4.345
|14.84
|1
|-
|3/05
| 27 November 2015
|4.337
|14.32
|1
|-
|3/06
| 4 December 2015
|3.963
|13.00
|1
|-
|3/07
| 11 December 2015
|4.427
|14.53
|1
|-
|3/08
| 18 December 2015
|5.284
|18.05
|1
|-
|3/09
| 25 December 2015
|4.071
|13.64
|1
|-
|3/10
| 1 January 2016
|3.832
|12.02
|1
|-
|3/11
| 8 January 2016
|4.701
|15.30
|1
|-
|3/12
| 15 January 2016
|3.969
|13.14
|1

Fourth season

|-
|4/01
| 15 April 2016
|3.631
|12.18
|1
|-
|4/02
| 22 April 2016
|3.725
|12.60
|1
|-
|4/03
| 29 April 2016
|3.367
|11.42
|1
|-
|4/04
| 6 May 2016
|3.765
|12.52
|1
|-
|4/05
| 13 May 2016
|3.908
|13.13
|1
|-
|4/06
| 20 May 2016
|3.667
|12.29
|1
|-
|4/07
| 27 May 2016
|3.934
|13.64
|1
|-
|4/08
| 3 June 2016
|3.178
|11.16
|1
|-
|4/09
| 10 June 2016
|3.545
|12.39
|1
|-
|4/10
| 17 June 2016
|3.156
|10.78
|1
|-
|4/11
| 24 June 2016
|3.394
|11.85
|1
|-
|4/12
| 1 July 2016
|3.754
|13.74
|1

Fifth season

|5/01
| 14 April 2017
|3.049
|11.73
|1
|-
|5/02
| 21 April 2017
|2.685
|10.62
|1
|-
|5/03
| 28 April 2017
|2.766
|11.18
|1
|-
|5/04
| 5 May 2017
|3.284
|13.41
|1
|-
|5/05
|12 May 2017
|3.260
|14.52
|1
|-
|5/06
|19 May 2017
|2.901
|12.41
|1
|-
|5/07
|26 May 2017
|1.654
|7.61
|1
|-
|5/08
|2 June 2017
|3.045
|13.10
|1
|-
|5/09
|9 June 2017
|2.907
|12.919
|1
|-
|5/10
|16 June 2017
|2.746
|10.73
|1
|-
|5/11
|23 June 2017
|3.062
|12.54
|1
|-
|5/12
|30 June 2017
|2.715
|11.63
|1
|-
|5/BTS
|7 July 2017
|1.631
|6.73
|1
|-

Sixth season

|6/01
| 13 April 2018
|2.038
|9.677
|1
|-
|6/02
| 20 April 2018
|2.207
|9.616
|1
|-
|6/03
| 27 April 2018
|1.459
|6.528
|1
|-
|6/04
| 4 May 2018
|2.003
|8.617
|1
|-
|6/05
|11 May 2018
|1.975
|8.866
|1
|-
|6/06
|18 May 2018
|2.313
|10.076
|1
|-
|6/07
|25 May 2018
|2.34
|9.881
|1
|-
|6/08
|1 June 2018
|1.988
|8.449
|1
|-
|6/09
|8 June 2018
|2.296
|9.889
|1
|-
|6/10
|15 June 2018
|1.926
|7.512
|1
|-
|6/11
|22 June 2018
|1.803
|8.899
|1
|-
|6/12
|29 June 2018
|1.88
|8.019
|1
|-

Other activities

References

External links
 Official Website 
 Official Weibo 

2014 Chinese television series debuts
2014 in Chinese music
Chinese television series based on South Korean television series
Chinese variety television shows
Running Man (TV series)
Zhejiang Television original programming